The 1932 Maine gubernatorial election took place on September 12, 1932. Incumbent Republican Governor William Tudor Gardiner did not seek re-election. Democratic candidate Louis J. Brann defeated Republican candidate Burleigh Martin. Brann was the first Democrat elected Governor of Maine since Oakley C. Curtis in 1914.

Results

References

Gubernatorial
1932
Maine
September 1932 events